Eta Kaize (born 5 July 1974) is an Indonesian beach volleyball player. She competed in the women's tournament at the 1996 Summer Olympics.

References

External links
 

1974 births
Living people
Indonesian women's beach volleyball players
Olympic beach volleyball players of Indonesia
Beach volleyball players at the 1996 Summer Olympics
Place of birth missing (living people)
Beach volleyball players at the 1998 Asian Games
20th-century Indonesian women